DnaJ homolog subfamily C member 5, also known as cysteine string protein or CSP is a protein, that in humans encoded by the DNAJC5 gene. It was first described in 1990.

Gene 

In humans, the gene is located on the long arm of chromosome 20 (20q13.33) on the Watson (positive strand). The gene is 40,867 bases in length and the encoded protein has 198 amino acids with a predicted molecular weight of 22.149 kiloDaltons (kDa). The weight of the mature protein is 34kDa.

This gene is highly conserved and found both in invertebrates and vertebrates. In humans, a pseudogene of this gene is located on the short arm of chromosome 8.

Structure 

The organisation of the protein is as follows:
 an N-terminus phosphorylation site for protein kinase A
 a J domain (~70 amino acids)
 a linker region
 a cysteine motif consisting of 13–15 cysteines within a stretch of 25 amino acids. It is heavily palmitoylated in the cysteine string motif.
 a less conserved C-terminal domain

Tissue distribution 

This protein is abundant in neural tissue and displays a characteristic localization to synaptic and clathrin coated vesicles. It is also found on secretory vesicles in endocrine, neuroendocrine and exocrine cells. This protein makes up ~1% of the protein content of the synaptic vesicles. DNAJC5 appears to have a role in stimulated exocytosis.

Function 

The encoded protein is a member of the J protein family. These proteins function in many cellular processes by regulating the ATPase activity of 70 kDa heat shock proteins (Hsp70). DNAJC5 is a guanine nucleotide exchange factor for Gα proteins. CSPα plays a role in membrane trafficking and protein folding, and has been shown to have anti-neurodegenerative properties. It is known to play a role in cystic fibrosis and Huntington's disease.

This protein has been proposed as a key element of the synaptic molecular machinery devoted to the rescue of synaptic proteins that have been unfolded by activity dependent stress.  Syntaxin 1A, a plasma membrane SNARE (soluble N-ethylmaleimide-sensitive factor attachment protein receptor) critical for neurotransmission, forms a complex with CSPα, a G protein and an N-type calcium channel. Huntingtin may be able displace both syntaxin 1A and CSPα from N-type channels. CSP interacts with the calcium sensor protein synaptotagmin 9 via its linker domain.

Huntingtin-interacting protein 14, a palmitoyl transferase, is required for exocytosis and targeting of CSP to synaptic vesicles. The palmitoyl residues are transferred to the cysteine residues. If these resides are mutated membrane targeting is reduced or lost. The rat CSP forms a complex with Sgt (SGTA) and Hsc70 (HSPA8) located on the synaptic vesicle surface. This complex functions as an ATP-dependent chaperone that reactivates denatured substrates.  Furthermore, the Csp/Sgt/Hsc70 complex appears to be important for maintenance of normal synapses.

Its expression may be increased with the use of lithium. Quercetin  promotes formation of stable CSPα-CSPα dimers.

Cysteine-string protein increases the calcium sensitivity of neurotransmitter exocytosis.

Interactions 
DNAJC5 has been shown to interact with the cystic fibrosis transmembrane conductance regulator.

Clinical significance 

Mutations in this gene may cause neuronal ceroid lipofuscinosis.

References

Further reading

External links 
  GeneReviews/NCBI/NIH/UW entry on Neuronal Ceroid-Lipofuscinosis

Heat shock proteins
Co-chaperones